Banida is an unincorporated community in Franklin County, in the U.S. state of Idaho.

History
A post office called Banida was established in 1912, and remained in operation until 1959.  The community's name is an amalgamation of Bannock Indians and Oneida County. A variant name was "Dunnville".

Banida's population was 100 in 1960.

Notable person
Joe J. Christensen, a general authority in the Church of Jesus Christ of Latter-day Saints, was born at Banida in 1929.

References

Unincorporated communities in Franklin County, Idaho